Reusch Glacier is a very small glacier descending into Relay Bay immediately east of Islands Point, along the north coast of Victoria Land. First charted by British Antarctic Expedition, 1898–1900, under C.E. Borchgrevink, who named this feature for Professor Hans Henrik Reusch, then president of the Norwegian Geographical Society.
 

Glaciers of Pennell Coast